Luuc Bugter (born 10 July 1993) is a Dutch racing cyclist, who currently rides for UCI Continental team .

Major results

2013
 7th Kernen Omloop Echt-Susteren
2014
 6th Overall Sharjah International Cycling Tour
1st  Young rider classification
2015
 1st Acht van Chaam
 4th Dorpenomloop Rucphen
 8th Kernen Omloop Echt-Susteren
 10th Overall Tour of China I
2016
 10th Ster van Zwolle
2017
 4th GP Viborg
 6th Dorpenomloop Rucphen
 8th Himmerland Rundt
2018
 1st  Overall Rás Tailteann
1st  Points classification
1st Stage 3
 5th Slag om Norg
 7th Midden–Brabant Poort Omloop
2019
 1st  Overall Tour d'Eure-et-Loir
1st Stage 3
 1st PWZ Zuidenveld Tour
 1st Stage 1 (TTT) Kreiz Breizh Elites
 3rd International Rhodes Grand Prix
 10th Omloop Mandel-Leie-Schelde

References

External links

1993 births
Living people
Dutch male cyclists
Rás Tailteann winners
Sportspeople from Arnhem
Cyclists from Gelderland
20th-century Dutch people
21st-century Dutch people